The Undivided Cachar district is a former administrative district of Assam Province (now Assam) that is largely congruous to Govinda Chandra's, the last king of the Kachari kingdom, domain in the southern part of Assam. It has been divided into the present-day Cachar, Dima Hasao (formerly known as North Cachar Hills) and Hailakandi districts in recent times. Dima Hasao is an Autonomous hill district of Assam, remaining Cachar and Hailakhandi of Dimasa Kingdom are a part of Barak Valley region. While Karimganj was a part of Sylhet, before Partition of Bengal.

References

Former districts of Assam